Arland Baron Thompson (born September 19, 1957) is a former American football offensive guard in the National Football League who played for the Denver Broncos, the Green Bay Packers, the Baltimore Colts and the Kansas City Chiefs.  Thompson  played collegiately for Baylor University before being drafted in the 4th round of the 1980 NFL Draft. Thompson played professionally for 4 seasons in the NFL and retired in 1987.

References

External links
Just Sports Stats

1957 births
Living people
People from Lockney, Texas
Players of American football from Texas
American football offensive guards
Baylor Bears football players
Denver Broncos players
Baltimore Colts players
Green Bay Packers players
Kansas City Chiefs players
Denver Gold players
San Antonio Gunslingers players
National Football League replacement players